Seyed Mohammad Karimi { (born 20 June 1996) is an Iranian footballer who plays as a central midfielder for Sepahan in the Persian Gulf Pro League.

He made his Iran Pro League debut on 3 August 2018 against Sepidrood Rasht.

Club career statistics 

Last Update:6 August 2021

Honours

Individual
Persian Gulf Pro League Most Assists: 2018–19

References

Sepahan S.C. footballers
1996 births
Living people
Iranian footballers
Iran youth international footballers
Association football midfielders
Sportspeople from Sari, Iran